Omega Sentinel (Karima Shapandar) is a superhero later supervillain appearing in American comic books published by Marvel Comics. The character is associated with the X-Men and its spinoff Excalibur.

Publication history
Karima Shapandar first appeared in X-Men Unlimited #27 (June 2000) and was created by Chris Claremont and Brett Booth.

Fictional character biography

Prime Sentinel
Shapandar was a police officer from India who was transformed into an Omega Prime Sentinel by Bastion of the Operation: Zero Tolerance program. It all started when Karima was dispatched to look after Neal Shaara (who would later become known as Thunderbird). Neal was looking for his brother Sanjit who had gone missing while researching some mysterious disappearances in Calcutta. A bond quickly developed between the two, and they were on the verge of beginning a romantic relationship when they were attacked and captured by Bastion. Neal learned that Sanjit had become a Prime Sentinel, programmed to seek out and destroy mutants. Bastion intended to do the same to Neal and Karima, but the morphing process catalyzed Neal's latent mutant power, which destroyed the building around him. Sanjit fought his programming long enough to disable the other Sentinels, but died in the process.

As Neal cradled Sanjit's body, Shapandar quietly told Neal to run. She had discovered that she was a Prime Sentinel; humans transformed into sentinels and set up as 'sleeper' agents, unaware of their programming until a nearby mutant activated them (as in Neal's usage of his mutant powers).

Neal refused, saying he loved Karima. Karima begged him to leave, saying she couldn't hold on much longer. Neal was forced to flee.

Genoshan Excalibur
Karima later resurfaces on the decimated island of Genosha, where she encounters Charles Xavier and Magneto. The two were able to disable her Sentinel programming and restore her mind, but the technological modifications to her body remained.

Karima stayed on the island with the others, working as a police officer to restore order. She is trying to adjust to her new form, which comes into conflicts with her Hindu beliefs. It is assumed she left the island with most of the other residents after Decimation.

Joining the X-Men
The X-Men discovered a disassembled Karima, along with Lady Mastermind in a lab of the Fordyce Clinic that was testing on mutants to see if someone can catch mutation like a disease. Beast reassembled her, but she appears to have lost part of her memory from the moment she got disassembled. Rogue officially recruited her onto the team to help fight the Children of the Vault.

Since then she was able to help fix a teleporter in the search to find Pandemic, helping in the fight to defeat him. After Rogue was infected with a virus by Pandemic, Cable took the team to his island so Rogue could be cared for. On the island, Karima helped the team and the island residents who were attacked by the Hecatomb.

Marauders and Malice
Omega Sentinel is possessed by Malice, who is now a digital entity instead of a psionic one, via email virus; thus, she unwillingly ends up joining the new Marauders. The other X-Men, save Emma Frost, were unaware of her being possessed until they were attacked by her along with the rest of the new Marauders, including Mystique and Lady Mastermind. She later fights alongside the other Marauders in Flint, Michigan, against Iceman and Cannonball, as both sides try to obtain the Diaries of Destiny.

Messiah Complex
Along with fellow Marauders Sunfire, Gambit, Prism, Blockbuster, Lady Mastermind, and Scalphunter, Malice travels to Cooperstown, Alaska to find the baby but instead come across the Purifiers and they come to blows.

The next time she is seen, she is fighting Colossus along with Arclight, Frenzy, and Unuscione. She then teams up with Lady Mastermind in taking out Wolverine by throwing a disguised Scrambler at him. After he realizes the deception, she hits him with an energy blast. While asking him about how he wants to die, Nightcrawler teleports in and knocks her out along with Lady Mastermind.

She recovers and joins Gambit, Sunfire and Vertigo when they confront Bishop, who is about to kill the baby. She seems to show a lot of affection towards the baby and finds it extraordinary that she isn't scared at all when she picks her up. She is present when Gambit delivers the baby to Mystique (in the guise of Mister Sinister) at the Marauders' base on Muir Isle and later battles the X-Men, X-Factor and X-Force when they arrive to take the baby. During the final battle over the child, Omega Sentinel is stabbed and somehow incapacitated by Pixie's Soul Dagger.

Divided We Stand
After the events of Messiah Complex, Karima manages to recover being taken over by the digital Malice, but has no memory of the events that took place, apparently a side effect of being wounded with Pixie's Soul Dagger. All she knows is that some of her files have been infected or damaged by a virus and can no longer access them in case of reinfection. She stayed with the Acolytes, saying the only reason she is there is because Professor Xavier was there for her when she was first turned into a Sentinel.

After asking Magneto which of their philosophies was right, Karima helps Magneto to revive the Professor from his coma and defends him against Joanna Cargill's murder attempt. Karima tries to stop Cargill by bombarding her with microwave radiation, but her physical invulnerability proves to be too much for her, and Cargill severely damages her. Magneto manages to stop Cargill from killing Xavier by firing a surgical laser into her eye when Exodus shows up and after trying to kill Magneto, engages the Professor in a fight on the astral plane.

When they finish their skirmish, Karima, Magneto, and Xavier leave the Acolytes and as Xavier parts with Karima and Magneto, he asks them not to follow him.

Later, Xavier returns to New Avalon and convinces Exodus to disband the Acolytes and find a new way to help mutantkind. While Exodus embarks on a personal pilgrimage to this effect, Karima, along with Amelia Voght and Random decide to relocate to San Francisco.

Following Cable's death at the end of Second Coming, Karima can be seen attending the memorial service for Cable.

Fables of the Reconstruction
To help deal with the damage to San Francisco done by Bastion and his forces, Cyclops puts together a team of X-Men including Karima. On the boat trip to the mainland, Karima reveals to Psylocke she has been experiencing some glitches as of late, not knowing that she is actually suffering from the virus unleashed on the Nimrod sentinels during Second Coming.

Arriving at the worksite for a building, Karima is paired with Danger and told to help excavate the site. As the day goes on, Karima's glitches get worse, and while helping Colossus, she accidentally shoots him with a powerful laser. She decides to sit out for a bit to check on her systems, but her Sentinel technology begins to take over, identifying the threat levels of each of the X-Men present, much to Karima's confusion. Suddenly, against her will, she flies towards Hellion and Hope Summers and begins attacking them. Assessing that Hope is the biggest threat present, she punches Hellion and tells Hope to run. When Hope questions Karima, she replies that it's too late and fires a laser blast at Hope.

Karima continues battling her fellow X-Men, and when her human side reasserts itself, she asks Hellion to put her out of her misery. He does so, cutting loose with his telekinetic abilities and causing massive damage to Omega Sentinel, who is left in a coma, possibly brain dead. Her body is moved to a stasis tank in the X-Men's lab.

Becoming Human
Karima's body is later reactivated and possessed by Arkea, a sentient bacterium and the sister of John Sublime. After taking control of much of the Jean Grey School's systems, Arkea begins to hunt down her brother for revenge from when he tried to kill her after they were formed, but is forced to retreat when she is confronted by Kitty Pryde, whose powers can destroy her systems. A group of X-Men and Sublime hunt her down to the crash site of the meteor in which she arrived on Earth, and confront her in a hospital specializing in mechanical implants. Karima manages to gain momentary control of her body and plunges Psylocke's psychic knife into her own head, apparently purging Arkea from her body and returning her to normal. After being given a complete physical test by Beast, he tells Karima her Omega Sentinel technology has been rendered inert due to Arkea's possession of her and that she is essentially human again. She decides to remain with the X-Men regardless of this, going on many more adventures with the female dominant mutant team until she decided to leave of her own accord as she had been offered a place alongside Sabra and Gabriel Shephard, two mutants they had recently worked alongside whilst hunting for Arkea. Karima left with them in the hopes that she would finally get back to the job she trained for many years ago.

Orchis Group
Somehow her sentinel programming was reactivated again and she now travels with members of a new mutant monitoring/profiling organization called Orchis to a new habitat built for humanity. Headed as the premiere doomsday network prepped in case of the extinction level event pertaining to the population density of Homo Superior; the Orchis Group is backed by numerous clandestine party assets, amongst other black budget and human-centric financial considerations, stemming from A.I.M., S.H.I.E.L.D., Alpha Flight, H.A.M.M.E.R., Hydra, etc. In fact, the lines between Karima's consciousness and the Sentinel programming started to blur as she edged more and more towards a complete Sentinel takeover. It wasn't only a mental change she was going through, the once inert physical components of the Omega Sentinel tech had also reactivated, replacing much of her organic tissue in the process. When discussing the use of machines on the Forge, she referred to them as her brothers and sisters and appeared to have more of a connection with them than with any of her human companions.

Later Nimrod challenges Omega Sentinel to share more intel from where she came from, which finally explains what Karima is doing with Orchis. Karima has actually been possessed by the conscious of an alternate version of herself hailing from a future where the mutants were dominant. Though she's vague about details, according to Karima, the mutants may have failed to behave as mercifully and so Karima's consciousness has been sent back in time, possessed the body of her younger self in order to change this. She also details how the Children of the Vault were defeated by Apocalypse, Genesis and the original Horsemen of Apocalypse. She also claims that the Dominions, cosmic machine collective consciousnesses and the great hope of machine life, were extinguished by mutants using the "Phoenix blade". Karima also claims that she removed Killian Devo's eyes and gave him the artificial ones that he has now which possesses false memories of having been to her future, which is what motivates him to join Orchis.

Powers and abilities
Karima is fitted with Omega-Prime Sentinel nanite technology which gives her superhuman strength, speed, reflexes, and endurance. She also has flight capacity, adaptive regeneration to repair any physical injury/damage she receives, and several projectile weapons, including high energy power blasts, as well as electrostatic poles built into her forearms that generate massive amounts of electrical energy and microwave radiation emitters. Her strength and durability were enhanced after she was rebuilt by the Beast. She appears to show limited technopathy and machine control, due to being able to "find" information from machines, and having the ability to control nanites in others' blood. She also has life-support technology built into her systems as evidenced in X-Men: Legacy #208 (April 2008). When possessed by the biocybernetic enzyme known as Arkea, Karima showcased a number of abilities she'd never readily accessed before such as greater machine and cybernetics control than previously displayed coupled with long range Teleportation capabilities.

As a prerequisite to being a detective in India, she was trained in basic combat skills, identity tracking, and other fundamental skills for human detective work. She also has knowledge to operate most basic and advanced Earth-based technology.

Other versions

House of M
She appears in "House of M" still as an Omega Sentinel but as the leader of the Sentinel Police for the House of Magnus.

X-Men: The End
Karima briefly appears fighting alongside the other X-Men in outer space. Not much is known about her.

In other media

Video games
Omega Sentinel was featured as a boss in the Facebook game Marvel: Avengers Alliance. She could later be unlocked as a playable hero by collecting 8 different comic book covers contained in Omega Lockboxes that could be obtained through various tasks in Special Operations 8.
Omega Sentinel was an unlockable character in Marvel Avengers Alliance Tactics.
Omega Sentinel is a playable champion in the mobile game Marvel Contest of Champions.

References

External links
MarvelDatabase:Karima Shapandar
MarvelDatabase:Character Gallery Karima Shapandar

Characters created by Chris Claremont
Characters created by Brett Booth
Comics characters introduced in 2000
Fictional detectives
Fictional technopaths
Indian superheroes
Marvel Comics characters who can move at superhuman speeds
Marvel Comics characters with accelerated healing
Marvel Comics characters with superhuman strength
Marvel Comics cyborgs
Marvel Comics female superheroes
Marvel Comics female supervillains
Marvel Comics police officers